Glen H. Davidson (born 1941) is a senior United States district judge of the United States District Court for the Northern District of Mississippi.

Education and career

Born in Pontotoc, Mississippi, Davidson received a Bachelor of Arts degree from the University of Mississippi in 1962 and a Juris Doctor from the University of Mississippi School of Law in 1965. He was a city prosecutor for Tupelo, Mississippi, in 1965. He was a United States Air Force captain, JAG Corps from 1966 to 1969, thereafter entering private practice in Tupelo from 1969 to 1981. He was an assistant district attorney of First Judicial District of Mississippi from 1969 to 1974 and a district attorney of First Judicial District of Mississippi in 1975. He was the United States Attorney for the Northern District of Mississippi from 1981 to 1985.

Federal judicial service

On July 23, 1985, Davidson was nominated by President Ronald Reagan to a new seat on the United States District Court for the Northern District of Mississippi created by 98 Stat. 333. He was confirmed by the United States Senate on October 17, 1985, and received his commission on October 17, 1985. He served as Chief Judge from 2000 to 2007, assuming senior status on June 1, 2007.

References

Sources
 

1941 births
Living people
People from Pontotoc, Mississippi
Judges of the United States District Court for the Northern District of Mississippi
United States district court judges appointed by Ronald Reagan
20th-century American judges
University of Mississippi alumni
United States Air Force officers
United States Attorneys for the Northern District of Mississippi
21st-century American judges